Cavipalpia argentilavella is a species of snout moth in the genus Cavipalpia. It is found in Australia.

References

Moths described in 1901
Phycitini